is a Japan-exclusive wrestling-based video game published by Imagineer in 1994, for the Super Famicom.

See also

Bishōjo game
List of licensed wrestling video games

References

External links
Wrestle Angels series at MobyGames
Super Wrestle Angels at Video Game Den
Fan review #1
Fan review #2

1994 video games
Bishōjo games
Fighting games
Imagineer games
Japan-exclusive video games
Professional wrestling games
Super Nintendo Entertainment System games
Super Nintendo Entertainment System-only games
Multiplayer and single-player video games
Video games developed in Japan
Women's professional wrestling